Susanna C. Larsson is a Swedish epidemiologist. She is Associate Professor at the  Institute of Environmental Medicine at the  Karolinska Institutet, Stockholm, Sweden. She is currently also associated with  the Neurology Unit, University of Cambridge, where she is part of a group engaged in a study on the effect of diet on stroke risk.

Life 
She graduated from Stockholm University, and Karolinska Institutet, Stockholm, Sweden. She did post-doctoral work at National Institute for Health and Welfare, Helsinki, Finland. She has been lead author for a number of major meta-analyses and reviews.

Selected works

References

External links 

 on the Karolinska Institutet website

Living people
Swedish scientists
Swedish epidemiologists
Academic staff of the Karolinska Institute
Karolinska Institute alumni
Stockholm University alumni
Year of birth missing (living people)